An Error Metric is a type of Metric used to measure the error of a forecasting model. They can provide a way for forecasters to quantitatively compare the performance of competing models. Some common error metrics are:

 Mean Squared Error (MSE)
 Root Mean Square Error (RMSE)
 Mean absolute error (MAE)
 Mean Absolute Scaled Error (MASE)
 Mean Absolute Percentage Error (MAPE)
 Symmetric Mean Absolute Percentage Error (SMAPE)